Jussi Heikki Tapio Vuori (born 11 July 1972), better known as Jussi 69, is the drummer for the Finnish rock band The 69 Eyes. He is best known for his flamboyant playing style; his kit is set up low to allow for the maximum exposure of his on-stage antics. His drumming relies primarily on cymbal flourishes rather than pure drum fills to transition between sections of a song. He appeared in an episode of Viva La Bam and in the film Bam Margera Presents: Where the ♯$&% Is Santa?.

Recording history

The 69 Eyes 
Bump 'n' Grind (1992)
Motor City Resurrection (1994)
Savage Garden (1995)
Wrap Your Troubles in Dreams (1997)
Wasting the Dawn (1999)
Blessed Be (2000)
Paris Kills (2002)
Framed in Blood – The Very Blessed of the 69 Eyes (2003)
Devils (2004)
Angels (2007)
The 69 Eyes: Hollywood Kills (2008)
Back in Blood (2009)
Х (2012)
Universal Monsters (2016)
West End (2019)

Briard 
Briard (Revisited) (1996) session drums

References

External links

1972 births
Living people
Finnish rock drummers
Musicians from Helsinki
21st-century drummers
The Local Band members